Donald Gibson (24 August 1908 – 2 September 1995) was an Australian rules footballer who played with North Melbourne in the Victorian Football League (VFL).

Career 
He played in three games during the 1929 season for the North Melbourne Football Club, scoring no goals.

Notes

External links 

1908 births
1995 deaths
Australian rules footballers from Victoria (Australia)
North Melbourne Football Club players